The lacrimal punctum (plural puncta) or lacrimal point, is a minute opening on the summits of the lacrimal papillae, seen on the margins of the eyelids at the lateral extremity of the lacrimal lake. There are two lacrimal puncta in the medial (inside) portion of each eyelid. Normally, the puncta dip into the lacrimal lake.

Together, they function to collect tears produced by the lacrimal glands. The fluid is conveyed through the lacrimal canaliculi to the lacrimal sac, and thence via the nasolacrimal duct to the inferior nasal meatus of the nasal passage.

Additional images

See also
Imperforate lacrimal punctum
Lacrimal apparatus
Punctal plug

References

External links
 Diagram and discussion at aafp.org

Human eye anatomy